Charti (also Romanized as Chartī) is a village in Holunchekan Rural District in the Central District of Qasr-e Qand County, Sistan and Baluchestan Province, Iran.

Population 
This village is located in Helonchgan district and according to the census of Iran Statistics Center in 2005 , its population was 45 people (9 households).

References 

Populated places in Qasr-e Qand County